The  Saraswati Barrage, also known as the Annaram Barrage is an irrigation project on Godavari River located at Annaram Village, Mahadevpur Mandal, Jayashankar Bhupalpally district in Telangana State, India.

This is the second point and one of the barrages proposed in Kaleshwaram Lift Irrigation Project which envisages construction of three barrages between Yellampalli and Medigadda.

Proposed Annaram Barrage details:

Project info
Annaram Barrage foundation was laid by First Chief Minister of Telangana, K.Chandrashekar Rao on 2 May 2016.

The project started by Telangana government as part of the Kaleshwaram Lift Irrigation Schema to irrigate the 18.5 lakh acres of new land and stabilize 11.8 lakh (1,118,000) acres (480,000 ha) of existing irrigated land.

See also
 Medigadda Barrage
 Sundilla Barrage
 Sriram Sagar Project
 Lower Manair Dam
 Mid Manair Dam
 Kaddam Project
 Upper Manair Dam
 SRSP Flood Flow Canal
 Nizam Sagar
 Pranahita Chevella
 Alisagar lift irrigation scheme
 Sri Komaram Bheem Project
 Devadula lift irrigation scheme
 Icchampally Project

References

Dams on the Godavari River
Dams in Telangana
Irrigation in Telangana
Adilabad district
Karimnagar district
Godavari basin